The following is a list of Belizean radio stations currently in operation.

National (operating in all districts)
 Positive Vibes FM (90.5, 102.9 FM)
 LOVE FM (95.1, 88.9, 98.1, 98.5 FM)
 KREM FM (96.5, 91.1, 101.1 FM)
 WAVE Radio (105.9, 99.9 FM)

Belize District
 Voice of God (Belize City) (105.5 FM)
 Owned by World Harvest Mission Center Church and operates from Korea Electronics.
 BFBS Radio 1/2 Belize (Ladyville) (99.1, 93.1 FM)
 Local branch of the British Forces Broadcasting Service. Available along much of the Northern Highway and on the Northside of Belize City, signals weak elsewhere.
 Integrity Radio (97.1 FM)
 Christian radio station established in the 2000s and operating from Vernon Street.
 Estereo Amor (95.9, 103.7 FM); MORE FM (94.7, 99.5, 107.1 FM)
 See RSV Media Center.
 Mood FM (Lords Bank Road) (106.3 FM)
 People's Radio (also known as The BEAT) (94.5 FM)
 Owned by the PUP's Remijio Montejo, operates from Central American Boulevard and directly competes with More FM.
 Reef Radio/Radio Arrecife (San Pedro) (92.3 FM)
 Popular radio station on Ambergris Caye.
 Radio Emanuel (San Pedro) (101.3 FM)
 Christian radio station on Ambergris Caye.
 Power FM 98.9 Christian Radio Station.

Corozal/Orange Walk District
 Power Mix Corozal (90.7 FM) International Radio
 Sugar City Radio Station (Orange Walk) (103.1 FM) SCRS.bz
 Home station of the UDP in Orange Walk.
 Romantica FM (Paraiso Village, Corozal) (102.5 FM)
 Royal FM 92.9 (Corozal)
 Radio Bahia (Corozal) (99.7 FM In Corozal)
 Rainbow FM (Corozal) (107.7 FM)
 KREM Radio Corozal affiliate.
 Fiesta FM (Orange Walk) (106.7 FM)
 See Centaur Cable Network. Home station of the PUP in Orange Walk.
 Universal Radio 88.5 FM
 East Radio 104.9 FM (Orange Walk Town)
Mood 106.3 fm, Alta Mira Corozal.

Cayo/Stann Creek/Toledo Districts
 Millenium Radio (Benque Viejo Del Carmen) (106.5)
 Radio Vision (San Ignacio Town) formerly Radio Ritmo (91.9 FM)
 Power Mix (Dangriga) (90.7 FM)
 My Refuge Christian (Belmopan and Roaring Creek 93.7 FM)
 Wamalali Radio (Punta Gorda) (106.3 FM)
 Toledo Christian Radio (Dump, Toledo) (99.9 FM)
 FM Maya (Toledo)
 Maximum Radio (Santa Elena, San Ignacio, Cayo District 104.1)

Defunct
 FM 2000 (90.5; 102.9 FM)
 Radio Belize (88.9, 91.1 FM)

Radio stations
Belize